On Earth as It Is in Heaven is the third album by the rock band Angel. It is the last album with Mickie Jones who had been the band's bass guitar player since its formation. It was produced by Eddie Kramer and recorded in an actual castle in the Hollywood Hills. "Cast the First Stone" and "Just A Dream" are very similar in sound to the songs on Angel and Helluva Band. In fact, "Cast The First Stone" was written during the Helluva Band sessions. The band toured non-stop and it was during this time they made their only tour of Japan. The album peaked at #76 on the US Billboard charts.

Lovember Records reissued On Earth... in a digitally remastered limited edition in August 2008. It included a 16-page booklet with liner notes by the journalist Dave Reynolds (Classic Rock magazine and Kerrang), a track-by-track run down by the singer Frank DiMino, all lyrics and previously unreleased photos. The LP originally contained a symmetrical poster of the album cover.

Track listing
All songs written by Frank DiMino, Gregg Giuffria and Punky Meadows, except where noted.
"Can You Feel It" - 4:44
"She's a Mover" - 3:37
"Big Boy (Let's Do It Again)" - 3:44
"White Lightning" - 4:40 (Punky Meadows, R. Morman)
"Telephone Exchange" - 4:12
"On the Rocks" - 3:39
"You're Not Fooling Me" - 4:03
"That Magic Touch" - 3:38
"Cast the First Stone" - 4:38
"Just a Dream" - 5:15

Personnel

Angel
Frank DiMino: vocals
Punky Meadows: acoustic and electric guitars
Gregg Giuffria: keyboards
Mickie Jones: bass guitar
Barry Brandt: drums

Additional personnel
Dan Wyman: synthesizer, programming

Production
Produced and engineered by Eddie Kramer
Mix assistant: Corky Stasiak
Technical assistance: Art Kelm, Richard Landers, Peter Oreckinto, Lon LeMaster
Tape operator: Rick Smith
Digital editing: John Kubick
Mastering: George Marino

References

1977 albums
Angel (band) albums
Albums produced by Eddie Kramer
Casablanca Records albums